Andrew Lewis Josephson (born July 15, 1964) is a member of the Alaska House of Representatives. He is a member of the Democratic Party.

Personal life and education
Josephson graduated from Whitman College in 1986 with a bachelor's degree in history. He also earned a master's degree in teaching from the University of Alaska Anchorage in 1992 and a JD from Penn State in 1997. He has spent almost his entire life in Alaska, mostly in Anchorage. Josephson's excellent tennis game keeps him ranked high in the Alaska House Tennis Caucus.

Career
Josephson served as an intern for Senator Ted Stevens. He also worked as a legislative aide and a teacher. He worked as an assistant district attorney in Kotzebue, Alaska from 1999 to 2001, before going into private practice. Josephson was elected to the Alaska House of Representatives in 2012.

References

External links
 Twitter account
 Vote Smart page
 Andy Josephson at 100 Years of Alaska's Legislature

1964 births
Alaska lawyers
Dickinson School of Law alumni
Educators from Alaska
Jewish American state legislators in Alaska
Living people
Democratic Party members of the Alaska House of Representatives
Politicians from Anchorage, Alaska
University of Alaska Anchorage alumni
Whitman College alumni
21st-century American politicians
Lawyers from Anchorage, Alaska
21st-century American Jews